Shalva Mumladze (born 18 August 1978) is a footballer who has played as a midfielder for clubs in Georgia, Ukraine and Azerbaijan.

Club career
Mumladze began playing professional football in the Georgian leagues, playing for Umaglesi Liga side FC Kolkheti-1913 Poti. In March 2002, Mumladze moved to Ukraine where he would spend two seasons with FC Spartak Sumy playing the Ukrainian First League. Mumladze returned to Georgia in 2004, playing for losing Georgia Cup finalist FC Torpedo Kutaisi. He moved to Azerbaijan in 2005, scoring five goals in the Azerbaijan Premier League for FC Sahdag Qusar.

References

External links

Profile at KLISF

1978 births
Living people
Footballers from Georgia (country)
Association football midfielders
FC Spartak Sumy players
Expatriate sportspeople from Georgia (country) in Azerbaijan